Auricularia fuscosuccinea is a species of edible Auriculariales fungus. It was first described scientifically in 1842 by French mycologist Camille Montagne as a species of Exidia. Paul Christoph Hennings transferred it to Auricularia in 1893.

References

External links

Agaricomycetes
Edible fungi
Fungi of Asia
Fungi of North America
Fungi of South America
Fungi of Colombia
Fungi described in 1842
Taxa named by Camille Montagne